The Philippines does not legally recognize same-sex unions, either in the form of marriage or civil unions. The Family Code of the Philippines defines only recognizes marriages between "a man and a woman". The 1987 Constitution itself does not mention the legality of same-sex unions or has explicit restrictions on marriage that would bare same-sex partners to enter into such arrangement.

Proposed legislation

Property rights of same-sex partners
While same sex unions are not recognized by the Philippine government, there has been proposals to introduce laws which would recognize same-sex partners' property rights that are similar to heterosexual couples. Such attempts include the 2013 proposal by Albay representative Edcel Lagman and 2019 proposal by Senator Imee Marcos. Under Lagman's proposal cohabitating same sex couples are able to register their partnership at a local Civil Registrar and document their co-owned or exclusive properties.

Same-sex union

Alavarez proposal
In October 2016, Speaker of the House of Representatives Pantaleon Alvarez announced that he would file a bill to legalize civil unions for both opposite-sex and same-sex couples. By October 25, 2016, more than 150 lawmakers had signified their support for the bill. Alvarez introduced House Bill 6595 on October 10, 2017. The bill was also under the wing of representatives Geraldine Roman of Bataan, Gwendolyn Garcia of Cebu, and Raneo Abu of Batangas. In the Senate, conservative senators Tito Sotto, Joel Villanueva vowed to block the bill should it ever pass the House of Representatives. Following the adjournment of the 17th Congress and the subsequent 2019 general elections, the civil union bill was reintroduced by Alvarez in May 2019.

Bagong Henerasyon proposal
Bagong Henerasyon representative Bernadette Dy filed House Bill No. 1357 during the 18th Congress in the House of Representatives which proposed civil partnerships for same-sex couples. Dy refiled the proposed measure as House Bill 1015 in the 19th Congress.

Padilla proposal
Senator Robin Padilla introduced Senate Bill No. 449 which proposed the institution of civil unions for both heterosexual and same sex partners, which does not require any religious rites. The measure includes recognition of property and adoption rights for same sex partners. 

The bill was characterized by Catholic Bishops’ Conference of the Philippines (CBCP) Episcopal Commission on Public Affairs executive secretary Fr. Jerome Secillano as an "infirmity" which could be a violation of "religious right" insisting that the state can't force the church of matters against its doctrine.Padilla, a Muslim, also lost support from the Grand Imam of the Marawi who withdrew support for him.

Explicit non-recognition and other limitations
The Family Code of the Philippines enacted into law in 1987 by President Corazon Aquino defines marriage as "a special contract of permanent union between a man and a woman" Republic Act No. 386 of 1949 or the Civil Code of the Philippines, also includes mentions of marriage as being between a man and a woman. There have been several attempts to include more explicit restriction to the Family Code to bare any de facto same sex unions. 

In 1998, Senator Marcelo Fernan filed Senate Bills No. 897 and 898 to append "biological" before "man" and "woman" in the Family Code so that only a pair of cisgender man and woman could legally get married. In 2004, Muntinlupa representative Ruffy Biazon filed House Bill No. 1245 in the House of Representative while his father Senator Rodolfo Biazon filed Senate Bill 1575, the counterpart bill, in the Senate. The proposed bills by the Biazons had a similar proposal limitting marriages to :natural born males and natural born females".

Senator Miriam Defensor Santiago's Senate Bill No. 1276 filed in 2004, meanwhile proposed the explicit non-recognition of same-sex unions solemnized abroad in the Philippines.

Bohol representative Rene Relampagos filed in 2011 House Bill No. 4269 amending the Family Code which tackles recognition of marriage and other forms of unions abroad. Among the provisions include "prohibited marriages" or forms or relationship explicitly not recognized. Reasoning that the Philippines public policy is to recognize marriage as a union between a man and a woman, the proposed measure explicitly bares the recognition of same sex unions.

Criminalization
During the 14th Congress, Manila representative Benny Abante filed House Bill No. 6919 in the House of Representatives proposing the criminalization of same sex unions. A former senior pastor of the Metropolitan Bible Baptist Church, Abante believed that such unions are "highly immoral, scandalous and detestable". He proposed penalties for applicants and solemnizing officers of same sex union rites. If the bill became law the penalties would have been imposed:

15 years imprisonment and a  fine for the partners in an unauthorized same sex union
If offenders who are public officers or employee – dismissal from government service and banned from re-employment in any public office
12 year imprisonment and  fee for anyone "faking" or "misdeclaring" their gender to secure a marriage license (i.e. declaring their gender as other than their assigned gender at birth)

The proposed legislation also mandates the Local Civil Registrar and the solemnizing officer to ascertain the gender of applicants before issuing a marriage license or prior to the ceremony.

Falcis III v. Civil Registrar-General

On June 19, 2018, the Philippine Supreme Court heard oral arguments in a historic case seeking to legalize same-sex marriage in the Philippines. The court dismissed the case for lack of standing in September 2019. The court stated that it could only make a decision if "real adversarial presentations" were shown, noting that the plaintiff could not claim injury since he was not seeking marriage for himself or had presented an actual case. The court, however, added that the 1987 Constitution in "plain text" imposes no restrictions on same-sex marriage.

See also 
LGBT rights in the Philippines
Recognition of same-sex unions in Asia

References

LGBT rights in the Philippines
Philippines